Major General Sir John Terence Nicholls O'Brien  (23 April 1830 – 25 February 1903) was a surveyor, engineer and colonial governor.

Born in Manchester, England, O'Brien studied at Elizabeth College, Guernsey, and then attended the Royal Military College, Sandhurst.

O'Brien, a British Army officer, received a medal of honour for his service in the Indian Mutiny War. He was appointed acting Governor of British Ceylon in 1863 and held the office for two years, succeeding Charles Justin MacCarthy.

In 1881, he was appointed governor of Heligoland, knighted in 1888 and became governor of Newfoundland in 1889.

O'Brien as governor of Newfoundland helped precipitate the 1894 bank crash by his many dispatches to London noting that Newfoundland politicians under Premier William Whiteway's Liberal Government were uniquely corrupt and incompetent. He resigned from office in 1895 and returned to London.

The Newfoundland community of Terenceville was so named in his honour. O'Brien's son, Sir Charles O'Brien, also became a colonial governor.

O'Brien died in 1903 in London, England.

See also
Governors of Newfoundland
List of people from Newfoundland and Labrador

References

External links
Biography at Government House The Governorship of Newfoundland and Labrador
Biography at the Dictionary of Canadian Biography Online

1830 births
1903 deaths
Companions of the Order of St Michael and St George
People educated at Elizabeth College, Guernsey
Graduates of the Royal Military College, Sandhurst
Governors of Newfoundland Colony
British East India Company Army officers
British Indian Army officers
British military personnel of the Indian Rebellion of 1857
Lieutenant Governors of Heligoland
Governors of British Ceylon
British expatriates in Sri Lanka
19th-century British military personnel
General Officers Commanding, Ceylon
Military personnel from Manchester